The 118th Air Support Operations Squadron (118 ASOS) is a combat support unit of the North Carolina Air National Guard. it is located in Badin, North Carolina. The 118th ASOS provides Tactical Command and Control of air power assets to the Joint Forces Air Component Commander and Joint Forces Land Component Commander for combat operations.

History 
The 118th Air Support Operations Squadron (ASOS) at the Stanly County Airport was originally formed as the 118th Aircraft Control and Warning Squadron (118th ACWS), of Charlotte, North Carolina. The Detachment of the squadron that would become the 118th ASOS was initially formed in Wadesboro, North Carolina, and designated Detachment A. While designated the 118th ACWS the unit was ordered to active duty during the Korean War with three squadrons of the Georgia Air National Guard on January 8, 1951. Unit personnel calibrated numerous early warning radar sites for the Strategic Air Command in the Sahara, and in the Atlas mountains in Morocco. From October 8, 1952, until 1999 the unit functioned as a separate state of the art Communications Squadron. In 1999 the Air Force realizing a shortfall, chose to re-role the 118th Combat Communications Squadron into the 118th Air Support Operations Squadron. With this new mission the unit has gone from a front line communications unit to a unit in direct support of the Army war fighter. The 118th ASOS currently is tasked with supporting both the North and South Carolina Army National Guard units.

References 

Air Support Operations 0015
Military units and formations in North Carolina